Gemma Howell (born 13 June 1990) is a British judoka from Stafford, England, who competed at the Olympic Games.

Judo career
Howell came to prominence after winning the winning the lightweight division at the British Judo Championships in 2006. As well as successfully defending the title in 2007 and 2008, she won medals at the 2008 World and European Junior Championships. In 2010, she won a medal at the European U23 Championships before winning a fourth British title in 2011.

In 2012, she was selected to represent Great Britain at the 2012 Summer Olympics in London. She competed in the Women's 63 kg, but was defeated in the first round. The following year she won her fifth and last British Championship, this time at the heavier weight of half-middleweight. In 2014, Howell took three medals at the Heart of England Championships, the Grand Prix in Zagreb and the European Open in Glasgow. She also competed in the women's 70 kg event at the 2020 Summer Olympics in Tokyo, Japan.

In May 2019, Howell was selected to compete at the 2019 European Games in Minsk, Belarus. She won the silver medal in her event at the 2022 Judo Grand Slam Tel Aviv held in Tel Aviv, Israel.

In 2022, she achieved her best success to date after winning the gold medal at the 2022 European Judo Championships in Sofia. Competing in the women's 63 kg she defeated Laura Fazliu in the final. Following this major success she then went on to win a silver medal in the 63kg category at the 2022 Commonwealth Games in Birmingham.

References

External links
 
 
 
 Gemma Howell at the British Judo Association (archived)
 

English female judoka
Living people
Olympic judoka of Great Britain
Judoka at the 2012 Summer Olympics
1990 births
European Games competitors for Great Britain
Judoka at the 2015 European Games
Judoka at the 2019 European Games
Judoka at the 2020 Summer Olympics
Judoka at the 2022 Commonwealth Games
Medallists at the 2022 Commonwealth Games
Commonwealth Games silver medallists for England
Commonwealth Games medallists in judo